Nossa Senhora dos Remédios may refer to the following locations:

 Nossa Senhora dos Remédios (Povoação), a parish in the municipality of Povoação (Azores), Portugal
 Nossa Senhora dos Remédios, Piauí, a municipality in the state of Piauí, Brazil